Sabine National Forest is located in East Texas near the Texas-Louisiana border. The forest is administered together with the other three United States National Forests and two National Grasslands located entirely in Texas, from common offices in Lufkin, Texas. There are local ranger district offices located in Hemphill.

It includes the officially designated Indian Mounds Wilderness, which is a part of the National Wilderness Preservation System.

The Sabine National Forest is notable for extensive forests of American beech and other hardwood trees.  Other important tree species include loblolly pine, longleaf pine, shortleaf pine, white oak, southern red oak, sweetgum, and Florida maple.

The Civilian Conservation Corps (CCC) helped the Texas Forest Service develop the forest between 1933 and 1940. CCC Company 893 established camp near Pineland, Texas on June 14, 1933, and planted pine seedlings in the southern part of the forest. These men also built roads and fire lookout towers and completed the Red Hills Lake Recreation Area near Toledo Bend Reservoir.  CCC Company 880 established camp near Center, Texas on October 26, 1933, and planted thousands of pine trees in an area that became the northern part of Sabine National Forest. The CCC built the Boles Field Campground, including a pavilion and amphitheater, in the forest near Shelbyville, Texas.

See also
Texas Forest Trail
List of U.S. National Forests

References

External links
 National Forests and Grasslands in Texas - U.S. Forest Service
 Sabine National Forest from the Handbook of Texas Online
 

National Forests of Texas
Protected areas of Sabine County, Texas
Protected areas of Shelby County, Texas
Protected areas of San Augustine County, Texas
Protected areas of Newton County, Texas
Protected areas of Jasper County, Texas
Protected areas established in 1936
1936 establishments in Texas